ESAF Small Finance Bank (formerly known as ESAF Microfinance and Investments Pvt. Ltd.) is an Indian small finance bank providing banking services and small loans to the underbanked. It was founded as a small finance bank in March 2017. ESAF Microfinance started its operations as an NGO in 1992 as Evangelical Social Action Forum. Before becoming a bank, ESAF was a non-banking finance company and microfinance institution (NBFC-MFI), licensed by the Reserve Bank of India (RBI) and headquartered in Thrissur city of Kerala.

History and operations
On 11 March 1992, K. Paul Thomas, along with Mereena Paul and a few friends, started ESAF in a small house in Mannuthy named Little. Jacob Samuel, one of the co-founders, coined the name ESAF, which is an acronym for Evangelical Social Action Forum. At inception, ESAF had five life members, seven annual members and eight honorary members. ESAF society was registered under the Travancore Cochin Literary, Scientific and Charitable Societies Registration Act. The initial president was Itty Mathew; J. Danabai was the vice president, Thomas was the secretary, supported by Samuel as joint secretary and Arun Ramakrishnan as treasurer.

ESAF started lending in 1995 as the first microfinance company in Kerala. It became ESAF Small Finance Bank after receiving the first banking license in Kerala since independence.

On 17 March 2017, Pinarayi Vijayan, the Chief Minister of Kerala officially inaugurated ESAF Small Finance Bank at Thrissur, Kerala. By August 2017, the bank had 3,750 employees, 284 branches, and a presence in 11 states.

In March 2018, a year after its launch, the bank had expanded to 4,000 employees and 400 branches, with  crore (US$ million) in deposits and  crore (US$ million) in loans.

ESAF Small Finance Bank received RBI approval to operate as scheduled bank in December 2018, making the Thrissur-based bank the fifth scheduled bank from Kerala. This will reduce the bank's cost of funds, while increasing the bank's ability and obligation to provide services. The bank's net profit increased to  crore in the 2019-2020 financial year from  crore the previous year.

On 26 March 2020, the bank received approval from SEBI for issuing its  crore initial public offering.

Gallery

See also

 Banking in India
 List of banks in India
 Reserve Bank of India
 Small finance bank
 Indian Financial System Code
 List of largest banks
 List of companies of India
 Make in India

References

Microfinance companies of India
Small finance banks
Financial services companies in Thrissur
Indian companies established in 1992
Financial services companies established in 1992
Private sector banks in India
1992 establishments in Kerala